Events from the year 1743 in art.

Events

Works
 Canaletto paints Rome: View of the Colosseum and the Arch of Constantine, The Molo, Looking West, The Piazzetta, Looking North and Capriccio: The Horses of S. Marco in the Piazzetta (now in British Royal Collection)
 Antonio Corradini sculpts The Vestal Virgin Tuccia 
 Arthur Devis probably paints Mr and Mrs Atherton
 William Hogarth begins painting his Marriage à-la-mode series
 Andrea Soldi paints a Self-portrait
 Louis-Michel van Loo completes The Family of Philip V

Births
 January 3 – Joseph-Benoît Suvée, Flemish painter (died 1807)
 March 5 – Jean-Simon Berthélemy, French history painter (died 1811)
 March 9 – Johann Kaspar Füssli, Swiss painter (died 1786)
 May 2 – William Parry, Welsh portrait painter (died 1791)
 July 24 – Giocondo Albertolli, Swiss-born architect, painter, and sculptor who was active in Italy (d. 1839)
 September 11 – Nikolaj Abraham Abildgaard, Danish Neoclassicist painter (died 1809)
 probable – Louis Jean Desprez, painter and architect (died 1804)
 date unknown
 Jean-Laurent Mosnier, French painter and miniaturist (died 1808)
 Erik Westzynthius the Younger, Finnish painter (died 1787)

Deaths
 January 3 – Ferdinando Galli Bibiena, Italian architect/designer/painter and author (born 1656)
 April 20 – Alexandre-François Desportes. French painter and decorative designer who specialised in animal works (b. 1661)
 September 14 – Nicolas Lancret, French painter (born 1690)
 October 9 – Wenzel Lorenz Reiner, Czech Baroque painter (born 1686)
 October 20 – Michael Dahl, Swedish portrait painter (born 1659)
 December
 Fra Galgario, Bergamese painter, mainly of portraits during the Rococo epoch (born 1655)
 Giuseppe Ghislandi, Italian painter from Bergamo (born 1655)
 December 27 – Hyacinthe Rigaud, French painter of Catalan origin (born 1659)
 date unknown
 Giacomo Antonio Arland, Italian painter (born 1668)
 Antoine Aveline, French engraver (born 1691)
 Pietro Paolo Cristofari, Italian artist responsible for a number of the mosaics in St. Peter's Basilica (born 1685)
 Placido Campolo, Italian painter of the late-Baroque period (born 1693)
 Girolamo Donnini, Italian painter of the Baroque period (born 1681)
 Antonio Filocamo, Italian painter at various churches and oratories in Messina (born 1669)
 Sarah Hoadly, English portrait painter (born 1676)
 Ogata Kenzan, Japanese potter and painter (born 1663)
 Giovanni Tuccari, Italian painter of battle scenes (born 1667)

References

 
Years of the 18th century in art
1740s in art